The Devonshire Street Tunnel is a  pedestrian tunnel located beneath the southern end of Central station connecting the suburb of Surry Hills with Railway Square in the Sydney central business district.

History

Opened in 1906 joining as a pedestrian continuation of Devonshire Street in the east to Lee Street in the west, it cut through what was the Devonshire Street Cemetery. In the early 1970s, the tunnel was refurbished with terrazzo panels and fluorescent lights and extended  to the west under Railway Square. In 1985 murals of trains and railway infrastructure were painted on the walls of the tunnel.

Route
At its eastern end, the tunnel begins at a head house descending from Chalmers Street to a vestibule from which both Central station and the tunnel can be accessed. The tunnel continues west from the vestibule under the tracks and platforms of the station, and opens onto Henry Deane Plaza, a depressed urban square opposite Railway Square filled with shops and restaurants.

The tunnel extension begins at a portal at the opposite end of Henry Deane Plaza, continuing under Lee Street, Railway Square, and George Street, each of these points at which it can be accessed by stairs and escalators. The tunnel extension then continues under the TAFE Marcus Clark Building and finally opens up at a portal behind the International Institute of Business and Information Technology at 841 George Street, connecting it to The Goods Line, providing an off-street connection between Central station and Darling Harbour.

See also
 List of tunnels in Australia

References

External links
[{
 "type": "ExternalData",
  "service": "geoline",
  "ids": "Q28225180",
  "properties":{"stroke-width": 5}
},
{
  "type": "ExternalData",
  "service": "page",
  "title": "Central station, Sydney.map"
}]
[{
 "type": "ExternalData",
  "service": "geoline",
  "ids": "Q28225180",
  "properties":{"stroke-width": 5}
},
{
  "type": "ExternalData",
  "service": "page",
  "title": "Central station precinct, Sydney.map"
}]

Tunnels in Sydney
Tunnels completed in 1906
1906 establishments in Australia
Pedestrian tunnels
Sydney central business district
Railway Square, Sydney
Surry Hills, New South Wales
George Street, Sydney